The 2019 Tajik Supercup was the 10th Tajik Supercup, an annual Tajik football match played between the winners of the previous season's Tajik League and Tajik Cup. The match was contested by 2018 League and Cup champions Istiklol, and the league runners-up Khujand. It was held at the Pamir Stadium in Dushanbe on 29 March 2019 with Istiklol winning the match 3–0. Istiklol took the lead through a Ruslan Koryan penalty in the 38th minute, both Koryan got his and Istiklol's second in the 50th minute. Koryan was replaced by Shahrom Samiyev in the 58th minute, with the substitute going on to score the third and final goal of the game in the 90th minute to secure Istiklol their 8th Supercup.

Match details

See also
2018 Tajik League
2018 Tajik Cup

References

Super Cup
Tajik Supercup